Amolita is a genus of moths in the family Erebidae.

Species
 Amolita delicata Barnes & McDunnough, 1912
 Amolita fessa Grote, 1874 – feeble grass moth
 Amolita fratercula Barnes & McDunnough, 1912
 Amolita intensa Dyar, 1914
 Amolita irrorata Hampson, 1910
 Amolita nyctichroa Hampson, 1910
 Amolita obliqua Smith, 1903 – oblique grass moth
 Amolita paranoma Dyar, 1914
 Amolita pepita Dyar, 1914
 Amolita perstriata Hampson, 1910
 Amolita roseola Smith, 1903
 Amolita sentalis (Kaye, 1901)
 Amolita solitaria Dyar, 1914

References
 Amolita at Markku Savela's Lepidoptera and Some Other Life Forms
 
 

Omopterini
Noctuoidea genera